Sadīd ud-Dīn Muhammad Ibn Muhammad 'Aufī Bukhārī (1171-1242), also known under the laqab Nour ud-Dīn, was a Persian historian, philologist, and author.

Biography
Born in Bukhara, Aufi claimed descent from Abd al-Raḥmān ibn ʿAwf (d. 654) a companion of the Islamic prophet Muhammad. He grew up during the apex of the Islamic Golden Age and spent many years traveling, exploring, and lecturing to the common folk and the royalty alike in Delhi, Khorasan, Khwarezm, Samarkand, Merv, Nishapur, Sistan and Ghaznin. Apparently Aufi was for some time in the service of the Qarakhanid Uthman ibn Ibrahim who placed him in charge of his correspondence (dīvān-e ensha). Aufi left Samarkand before 1204. Later he spent most of his time at the court of the Ghurids. He dedicated his first grand work Lubab ul-Albab, which consisted of poems by kings and poets of ancient times, to Amir Nāsiruddīn Qobājeh (ناصرالدین قباجه) (d. 1227), who was then ruler of Multan.

His second magnum opus Jawami ul-Hikayat was written under the name of the Vizier of the Ghurid Amir of Delhi. He lived during the reign of Shamsuddin Iltutmish (Altamash) (r. 1211–1236)  who was the third Muslim Turkic sultan of the Sultanate of Delhi, and the book is dedicated to his minister, Nizām-ul-Mulk Muhammad, son of Abu Sa'id Junaidi. These two are the only remaining works from him today. His works on The History of Turkistani Lords, and his book On the Properties of Matter, both referenced elsewhere, do not exist anymore. A small fragment of his Madāyih al-Sultān remains.

Works 

 Lubab ul-Albab (Heart of hearts, لباب الالباب), published 1220.
 Al-Farj ba'd ul-Shudat (Joy after difficulty, الفرج بعد الشدة), translated 1226.
 Jawami ul-Hikayat (Collection of tales and the light of traditions, جوامع الحكايات و لوامع الروايات), published 1228.

Work online

See also
List of Iranian scientists
List of Persian poets and authors

References

External links
 
 

People from Bukhara
Aufi
Aufi
13th-century Iranian historians
Iranian emigrants to India
Historians of India